Faxe Ladeplads or Fakse Ladeplads is a coastal town in Denmark with a population of 2,884 (1 January 2022), located in Zealand and lying 5 kilometers south-east from Faxe. It is mainly a harbour town, with a working harbour and a marina. The town is surrounded by forest and sandy beaches with shallow water. The forest stretches all the way to the sea, and from the edge one can see the island of Møn and the small protected wildlife park, Feddet.

History
The town was originally called Hylleholt. The current name comes from a time in the 19th century when the countship of Vemmetofte decided to build a harbour to service the limestone industry up in the neighboring Faxe town. Ladeplads literally means stock area.

In the town is Hylleholt Church from 1878. The local railway (Østsjællands Jernbane) coming from Køge was inaugurated in 1879, from Faxe Kalkbrud (Limestone Quarry), Faxe Limestone Quarry in Faxe on a narrow gauge railway and the narrow gauge railway was running on a normal gauge railway to the harbor in Faxe Ladeplads.

Education
Hylleholt School was founded in 1878. In the first years it was referred to as Strandskolen (The Beach School) because of the town's location by the beach.

In 1975 the building of a new school began on Dannebrogsvej 1, because of the old school's lack of modernization, expansion opportunities and the fact that the school was very expensive to heat.

Faxehus Efterskole and Waldemarsbo Efterskole located in Faxe Ladeplads.

Faxehus Efterskole began on Strandstræde 3, in 1980, in Faxe Ladeplads. Its buildings were built in 1908 and functioned as a beach resort.

Waldemarsbo Efterskole began on Hylleholtvej 6, in 1979 in Faxe Ladeplads

Attractions
The main attraction is the nature and fresh air from the sea. A couple of campsites exist in the area.

Notable people 
 Malthe Engelsted (1852 - 1930 in Faxe Ladeplads), Danish Master of Arts and painter
 Sir Alfred William Flux CB (1867 – 1942 in Faxe Ladeplads), British economist and statistician; retired to Denmark in 1932 and was knighted in 1934

References

Cities and towns in Region Zealand
Faxe Municipality